Neil Callan is an Irish horse racing jockey. He has been ranked in the top echelon of riders on the UK jockeys' championship and has finished runner-up in 2005 (151 wins) and 2007 (170 wins). In 2010/2011 he rode 5 winners during his first three-month stint in Hong Kong.

Major wins
 Great Britain
 Fillies' Mile - (1) - Hibaayeb (2009)
 Middle Park Stakes - (1) - Amadeus Wolf (2005)
 Nunthorpe Stakes - (1) - Borderlescott (2009)
 Racing Post Trophy - (1) - Palace Episode (2005)
 Sun Chariot Stakes - (1) - Fonteyn (2022)

 Germany
 Bayerisches Zuchtrennen - (1) - Pressing (2009)

 Hong Kong
 Centenary Sprint Cup - (1) - Peniaphobia (2017)
 Hong Kong Champions & Chater Cup - (2) - Blazing Speed (2014,2016)
 Queen Elizabeth II Cup - (1) - Blazing Speed (2015)
 Hong Kong Classic Mile - (1) - Beauty Only (2015)

 Italy
 Gran Premio del Jockey Club - (1) - Rainbow Peak (2010)
 Premio Roma - (1) - Pressing (2007)

Performance at the Hong Kong Jockey Club

References

The Hong Kong Jockey Club

Hong Kong jockeys
Living people
Year of birth missing (living people)